Simon Beck may refer to:
 Simon Beck (luger) (born 1947), Liechtenstein luger
 Simon Beck (artist) (born 1958), British snow artist and former cartographer